Coleophora monteiroi is a moth of the family Coleophoridae. It is found in Portugal.

References

monteiroi
Moths described in 1961
Moths of Europe